Seeing New York (Seeing New York Automobiles, Inc.) was a New York City sightseeing tour company that operated electric omnibuses and boats in the early 20th century.

Tours in open-topped buses left from the Flatiron Building (then the Fuller Building), where the windows were painted to advertise "coaches, automobiles, and yachts". The men wore suits, the women wore gloves and elaborate, often feathered hats. They visited "the historic section, in its Dutch, British and American periods; the Bowery, Chinatown, Brooklyn, Castle Garden, Central Park, the Grand Boulevards, the historic Hudson river, Columbia University, General Grant's tomb, [and] statues of Christopher Columbus and William Shakespeare." By 1913, manager J. H. Mulligan and local manager R. H. Green were operating eight vehicles. In 1904 The Evening World described the tours: 

As with celebrity tours today, Seeing New York might make stops at private residences of those in the headlines. Hannah Elias, covered in lurid terms in the press, was one such stop, with the coach returning for a second trip, apparently at the request of the guests.

Seeing Yacht 
The "Seeing Yacht," for a fare of $1, gave a three-hour tour that circled "the island of Manhatton[sic], showing the statue of Liberty, Blackwell's island [now Roosevelt Island], Jersey City, Brooklyn, Harlem, Bronx, the navy yard, the ocean liners and the wharves, with their commerce and extensive shipping interests."

References 

Companies based in Manhattan